George Henry Case (4 April 1839 – 21 April 1911) was an English first-class cricketer and physician.

Case was born at Fareham in April 1839. He was a physician by profession. Case played two first-class cricket matches for Hampshire in 1864. The first was against Sussex at Southampton, in what was Hampshire's inaugural first-class match. He became the first Hampshire batsman to be listed as absent ill; but probably, as a doctor, he was called away in Hampshire's first innings to a medical emergency. His second first-class appearance of 1864 came against Middlesex at Southampton. He scored 85 runs in his two first-class matches, with a high score of 48. while with the ball he bowled 10 wicketless overs. He was also involved with Hampshire in an administrative capacity, serving on the club's committee. His medical practice began on the Isle of Wight, where he remained until 1862. From there he returned to Fareham, later becoming the towns Medical Officer in 1874. He was a member of the Worshipful Society of Apothecaries, having been appointed in 1860. Case died at Fareham in April 1911.

References

External links

1839 births
1911 deaths
People from Fareham
19th-century English medical doctors
English cricketers
Hampshire cricketers
English cricket administrators
20th-century English medical doctors